Established in 2000, the Busan Film Critics Awards is run by the Busan Film Critics Association (BCFA), a small but independent-minded group of critics based in Busan, South Korea. Each year they announce their choices shortly before the opening of the Busan International Film Festival (BIFF), and a ceremony is then held at the festival to present the prizes. Their choices are not swayed by popular opinion, but represent a thoughtful and serious attempt to judge the greatest achievements of each year.

Best Film

Best Director

Best Actor

Best Actress

Best Supporting Actor

Best Supporting Actress

Best New Director

Best New Actor

Best New Actress

Best Screenplay

Best Cinematography

Technical Award

Special Jury Prize

Award for Artistic Contribution

Lee Pil-woo Award

References

See also 
Cinema of Korea
List of movie awards

South Korean film awards
Awards established in 2000
Annual events in South Korea